Anton Wildgans (17 April 1881 – 3 May 1932) was an Austrian poet and playwright. 
He was nominated for the Nobel Prize in Literature four times.

Life
Born in Vienna, Wildgans studied law at the University of Vienna, from 1900 to 1909, and then practiced as an examining magistrate (Untersuchungsrichter) from 1909 to 1911, before devoting himself to writing full-time.

His works, in which realism, neo-romanticism and expressionism mingle, focus on the drama of daily life.

He twice served as director of Vienna's Burgtheater, in 1921–1922 and 1930–1931.

One of his teachers was the Austrian Jewish philosopher Wilhelm Jerusalem. Wildgans was the mentor of writer Albert Drach.

Wildgans died in Mödling. The Wildganshof, a residential development in the 3rd District of Vienna, is named after him.

Selected works
 Armut ("Poverty"), drama, 1914
 Liebe ("Love"), drama, 1916
 Dies Iræ, drama, 1918
 Sämtliche Werke ("Complete Works"), 1948. Historical-critical edition in 8 volumes edited by Lilly Wildgans with the collaboration of Otto Rommel. Vienna/Salzburg: Gemeinschaftsverlag Bellaria/Pustet, 1948

References

External links
 
 

1881 births
1932 deaths
20th-century Austrian poets
Austrian male poets
Austrian people of Czech descent
Writers from Vienna
Male dramatists and playwrights
20th-century dramatists and playwrights
20th-century Austrian male writers